Ramakrishnapuram is a village in Rowthulapudi Mandal, Kakinada district in the state of Andhra Pradesh in India.

Geography 

Demographics 
 India census, Ramakrishnapuram had a population of 489, out of which 248 were male and 241 were female. The population of children below 6 years of age was 47. The literacy rate of the village was 74.89%.

References 

Villages in Rowthulapudi mandal